Ethel Moses (April 29, 1904 – June 1982) was an American actress and dancer, billed as "the black Jean Harlow". She is best known for working in films by Oscar Micheaux.

Early life
Ethel Moses was born in Staunton, Virginia and raised in Philadelphia, Pennsylvania, the daughter of William Henry Moses and Julia Trent Moses. Her sisters Lucia and Julia also became performers; their brother Bill taught at Hampton Institute. Their father was a prominent Baptist preacher in New York who disapproved of (but did not prevent) his daughters' stage careers. Ethel attended the Nannie Helen Burroughs School in the District of Columbia. Her aunt, Lena Trent Gordon, was a Philadelphia-area political organizer who served on a national committee with Burroughs.

Career
In 1924 she made her stage debut as a dancer in a show called Dixie to Broadway. She won a beauty contest at the Savoy Hotel in 1926. In 1929 Ethel Moses was voted the "Shapeliest Chorus Girl" on the New York stage; her sister Lucia placed second in the same poll. She was in the company of a Broadway revival of Showboat in 1932. She danced at the Cotton Club, and toured Europe with the Cab Calloway band.

In the mid-1930s, she began working with filmmaker Oscar Micheaux; her first film role was as "The Bronze Venus", an artist's model who is seen nearly nude on screen, in Micheaux's Temptation (1936). The pair followed that success with Underworld (1937), in which Moses plays a college student, and God's Stepchildren (also 1937), in which she played two characters. Finally she was in a remake of Micheaux's silent picture, Birthright (remade in 1939). Moses also appeared in several musical shorts, including Cab Calloway's Jitterbug Party (1935).

Ethel Moses left show business by early 1940.

Personal life
Ethel Moses married Benny Payne, a pianist in Cab Calloway's band.  They eventually divorced, and in the 1940s Ethel was remarried to a factory worker, Frank Ryan; they lived in Jamaica, Queens. She died in 1982, in Brooklyn, aged 78 years.

Her nephew is Bob Moses, a civil rights activist and educator.

References

External links

Ethel Moses listing at IBDB.
Ethel Moses listing at BFI.

1904 births
1982 deaths
20th-century American actresses
People from Staunton, Virginia
Actresses from Virginia
Actresses from Philadelphia
American film actresses
African-American actresses
20th-century African-American women
20th-century African-American people
American female dancers
Dancers from Virginia
Dancers from Pennsylvania
20th-century American dancers
African-American female dancers